Maximilian Theodor (Max) Buch (29 August 1850 Räpina, Livonian Governorate, Russian Empire – 6 January 1920 Lappeenranta, Finland) was a Baltic German-born Finnish physician, ethnographer, court councillor, Finnish nationalist, and advocate of public education. His extensive literary production is mainly in German, but he also published in Swedish and Russian.

Scientific studies
He made ethnographic observations among the Udmurts (Votyaks) and published the study Die Wotjäken: Eine Ethnologische Studie in 1882. He also wrote on Estonian folk religion.

Scientific theories

Buch is also noted for his controversial studies in curing alcoholism by means of strychnine.

Public education

Buch authored the pamphlet, Finnland und seine Nationalitätenfrage ("Finland and Her Nationality Question"), in which he detailed the low availability of schooling and the emphasis of a Swedish language on Finns. In a summary by Peter Kropotkin, "Out of 300,000 children of school age in 1881, only 26,900 received instruction in 576 permanent schools, of which 134 were Swedish."

References 

Finnish people of Baltic German descent
19th-century Finnish physicians
20th-century Finnish physicians
Finnish nationalists
Finnish ethnographers
1920 deaths
1850 births
People from Räpina